Jonny Mattock is an English drummer and percussionist from Northampton, England, who was a member of, or played with, Massive Attack, Spacemen 3, Spiritualized, The Perfect Disaster, Slipstream, Lupine Howl, Cranes, Baxter Dury, The Breeders, The Jazz Butcher, Honey Tongue, Josephine Wiggs Experience, Freelovebabies.
He now teaches music at his local college.

References

Living people
Year of birth missing (living people)
English rock drummers
British male drummers
People from Northampton
The Breeders members
Spacemen 3 members
Spiritualized members
The Perfect Disaster members
Honey Tongue members